The Tiburon paintbrush or Tiburon Indian paintbrush (Castilleja neglecta syn. for Castilleja affinis subsp. neglecta) is an endangered taxon of flowering plant in the family Orobanchaceae. It is endemic to the San Francisco Bay Area in California in the United States, where it occurs in Marin, Napa, and Santa Clara Counties.

This plant is listed as threatened by the state of California and endangered by the United States government.

Description
This plant is a perennial herb with a bristly green and purplish stem 15 to 60 centimeters tall. The lance-shaped leaves are 2 to 4 centimeters long and lobed or not. The inflorescence is up to 2.5 centimeters wide and has bracts in shades of yellow, sometimes to pink or reddish orange. The flowers are roughly 2 centimeters long and vary from green to purple with red or yellow margins.

The plant grows on serpentine soils below 300 meters in elevation.

See also
Rare species
Endangered Species Recovery Plan

References

External links
CalPhotos

neglecta
Endemic flora of California
Natural history of the California chaparral and woodlands
Natural history of the California Coast Ranges
Natural history of the San Francisco Bay Area
Critically endangered flora of California
Tiburon, California